Tachie is a Carrier village in British Columbia, located where the Tachie River enters Stuart Lake. It is one of the reserves belonging to Tl'azt'en Nation. Tachie is the English spelling of the Carrier language name Tache.

References

Settlements in British Columbia